Thomas Baty (8 February 1869 – 9 February 1954), also known by the name Irene Clyde, was an English writer, lawyer and expert on international law who spent much of his career working for the Imperial Japanese government. Baty was also an activist for feminism, opposing the concept of a gender binary, and has been described as non-binary, transgender, or as a trans woman, by several modern writers. In 1909, he published Beatrice the Sixteenth, a utopian science fiction novel, set in a postgender society. He also co-edited Urania, a privately circulated feminist gender studies journal, alongside Eva Gore-Booth, Esther Roper, Dorothy Cornish, and Jessey Wade.

Biography
Thomas Baty was born 8 February 1869, in Stanwix, Cumberland, England. His father was a cabinet-maker, who died when Baty was 7. At school, he was a very gifted student and he was given a scholarship to study at The Queen's College, Oxford. He entered that establishment in 1888, and got his bachelor's degree in jurisprudence in 1892. In June 1901 he received the degree of LL.M. from Trinity College, Cambridge. He got his D.C.L. from Oxford in 1901 and his LL.D. from Cambridge in 1903. His expertise was in the field of international law. He taught law at Nottingham, Oxford, London and Liverpool Universities. At that time, he became a prolific writer on international law.

In 1909, Baty published Beatrice the Sixteenth, his first book under the name Irene Clyde. Set in Armeria, it describes a genderless land of people with feminine characteristics who form life partnerships together. In 1916, along with Esther Roper, Eva Gore-Booth, Dorothy Cornish, and Jessey Wade, Baty, again using the name Irene Clyde, founded Urania, a privately circulated journal which expressed his pioneering views on gender and sexuality, opposing the "insistent differentiation" of people into a binary of two genders. He also wrote under the name Theta.

Following the outbreak of the First World War, Baty took part in the establishment of the Grotius Society, established in London in 1915. As one of the original members of that society, Baty got to know Isaburo Yoshida, Second Secretary of the Japanese Embassy in London and an international law scholar from the graduate school of the Tokyo Imperial University. The Japanese government was at that time searching for a foreign legal adviser following the death of Henry Willard Denison, a US citizen who served in that position until his death in 1914. Baty applied for that position in February 1915. The Japanese government accepted his application, and he came to Tokyo in May 1916 to start his work. In 1920, he was awarded the Order of the Sacred Treasure, third class, for his service as a legal adviser. He renewed his working contracts with the Japanese Ministry of Foreign Affairs several times, until in 1928 he became a permanent employee of that ministry. During his work for the Japanese government, Baty developed the notion that China was not worthy of recognition as a state under international law, a view that was later used to justify the Japanese invasion of China. In 1936, he was awarded the Order of the Sacred Treasure, second class.

In 1927, he was part of the Japanese delegation to the Geneva Naval Conference on disarmament. This was his only public appearance as legal adviser to the Japanese government, as the rest of his work involved mainly writing legal opinions. In 1932, following the Japanese invasion of North China and the formation of Manchukuo, Baty defended the Japanese position in the League of Nations and called to accept the new state to league membership. He also wrote legal opinions in defense of the Japanese invasion of China in 1937.

In 1934, as Irene Clyde, Baty published Eve's Sour Apples, a series of essays in which he attacked sex-based distinctions and marriage.

In July 1941, the Japanese government froze the assets of foreigners residing in Japan or any of its colonial possessions in retaliation for the same move against Japanese assets in the US, but Baty was exempt from this due to his service for the Japanese government. Baty decided to remain in Japan even following the outbreak of war between that country and the British Empire in December 1941. He rejected the efforts by the British Embassy to repatriate him, and kept working for the Japanese government even during the war. He defended the Japanese policy of conquest as a remedy to western colonialism in Asia. In late 1944, he questioned the legitimacy of the pro-Allied governments established following the end of the German occupation in Belgium and France.

Following the Japanese surrender in 1945, the British Ministry of Foreign Affairs was considering indicting Baty for treason, but the Central Liaison Office (a British government agency operating in Japan) provided an opinion stating that Baty's involvement with the Japanese government during the war was insignificant. In addition, some legal advisers within the British government shielded Baty from possible prosecution on the grounds that he was too old to stand trial. Instead, the British government decided to revoke Baty's British citizenship and leave him in Japan.

Baty died of a cerebral haemorrhage in Ichinomiya, Chiba, Japan, on 9 February 1954. The Emperor of Japan sent floral tributes, as did many of the people who knew Baty. Eulogies were delivered by Prime Minister Shigeru Yoshida, Foreign Minister Katsuo Okazaki, Saburo Yamada (President of the Japanese Society of International Law) and Iyemasa Tokugawa (a former colleague). He was buried in Aoyama Cemetery, Tokyo, alongside his sister and mother.

Legal philosophy
Baty's legal philosophy evolved as he worked for the Japanese government and was designed to justify Japanese actions of encroaching upon the sovereignty of China. His main argument was that the recognition of states must depend on one factor alone effective control by the military and security forces of the government over the state's territory, and not on preconceived definitions of what the state should be. For that reason he opposed the procedure of according de facto recognition, claiming that only final and irrevocable recognition must be used, and accusing the western international community of hypocrisy in using the de facto recognition as a means to allow some transactions with governments of states unfriendly to them without making the definite commitment to accept them fully into the family of nations.

Personal life
Baty never married. Some evidence suggests that he hated sex, as he was disillusioned with Victorian sexual norms and disgusted by the then accepted notions of male domination over women. He described himself as a radical feminist and a pacifist. Baty lived out the principles promoted by Urania which challenged the binary conception of gender, and for this reason is sometimes remembered as non-binary, transgender, or as a trans woman when discussed in connection with Urania.

An important person in his life was his sister, who went with him to Japan in 1916, and lived with him until her death in 1945.

Baty was a strict vegetarian since the age of 19; he was later vice-president of the British Vegetarian Society. He was also a member of the Humanitarian League.

Works

Books

As Thomas Baty
 International Law in South Africa (London: Stevens and Haynes, 1900)
 International Law (New York: Longmans, Green, and Co.; London; John Murray, 1909)
Polarized Law (London: Stevens and Haynes, 1914)
 (with John H. Morgan) War: Its Conduct and Legal Results (New York: E. P. Dutton and Co., 1915)
Vicarious Liability (Oxford: Clarendon Press, 1916)
 The Canons of International Law (London: John Murray, 1930)
 Academic Colours (Tokyo: Kenkyusha Press, 1934)
 International Law in Twilight (Tokyo: Maruzen Publishing Co., 1954)
 Alone in Japan (Tokyo: Maruzen Publishing Co., 1959), memoirs
(ed. Julian Franklyn) Vital Heraldry (Edinburgh: The Armorial Register, 1962)

As Irene Clyde
 Beatrice the Sixteenth (London: George Bell & Sons, 1909; New York: Macmillan, 1909)
 Eve's Sour Apples (London: Eric Partridge at the Scholartis Press, 1934)

Articles
 

"Can an Anarchy be a State?" American Journal of International Law, Vol. 28, No. 3 (Jul., 1934), pp. 444–455
 "Abuse of Terms: 'Recognition': 'War'" American Journal of International Law, Vol. 30, No. 3 (Jul., 1936), pp. 377–399 (advocating the recognition of Manchukuo)
 "The 'Private International Law' of Japan" Monumenta Nipponica, Vol. 2, No. 2 (Jul., 1939), pp. 386–408
 "The Literary Introduction of Japan to Europe" Monumenta Nipponica, Vol. 7, No. 1/2 (1951), pp. 24–39, Vol. 8, No. 1/2 (1952), pp. 15–46, Vol. 9, No. 1/2 (1953), pp. 62–82 and Vol. 10, No. 1/2 (1954), pp. 65–80

References

Further reading

External links 
 

1869 births
1954 deaths
19th-century English writers
20th-century English writers
Alumni of The Queen's College, Oxford
Alumni of Trinity College, Cambridge
British vegetarianism activists
Burials in Japan
Denaturalized citizens of the United Kingdom
English barristers
English expatriates in Japan
English feminist writers
English pacifists
English science fiction writers
International law scholars
English LGBT writers
Non-binary writers
Organization founders
People associated with the Vegetarian Society
People from Cumberland
Pseudonymous writers
Radical feminists
Recipients of the Order of the Sacred Treasure, 2nd class
Recipients of the Order of the Sacred Treasure, 3rd class
Transgender academics
LGBT lawyers
Transgender writers
Transgender non-binary people
Transgender rights activists
Asexual non-binary people